Methylopila oligotropha is a methanotroph bacterium species from the genus of Methylopila which has been isolated from a groundwater aquifer.

References

Further reading

External links
Type strain of Methylosinus sporium at BacDive -  the Bacterial Diversity Metadatabase

Methylocystaceae
Bacteria described in 1993